Pesujban (also Romanized as Pesūjbān; also known as Pasoojan, Pasūjān, and Pesūjān) is a village in Pariz Rural District, Pariz District, Sirjan County, Kerman Province, Iran. At the 2006 census, its population was 332, in 100 families.

References 

Populated places in Sirjan County